SuperSweet is a database of tasting and sweet molecules.

See also
sugar substitute
Aroma compounds

References

External links
 http://bioinformatics.charite.de/sweet/.

Biological databases
Flavors
Sugar substitutes